Qudsia Begum, born Udham Bai ( 1768) was a wife of Mughal emperor Muhammad Shah and mother of emperor Ahmad Shah Bahadur. She was an administrator and served as de facto regent of India from 1748 to 1754.

Early years
A Hindu by origin, Udham Bai had been formerly a public dancing girl. She had a brother named Man Khan. She was introduced to Muhammad Shah's attention by Khadija Khanum, the daughter of Umdat-Ul-Mulk, Amir Khan. The emperor was so fascinated by her, that he raised her to the dignity of an empress. She was a woman of no refinement who denigrated her position. She gave birth to Muhammad Shah's only surviving son, Ahmad Shah Bahadur on 23 December 1725. Her son was, however, brought up by Muhammad Shah's empresses Badshah Begum and Sahiba Mahal.

Empress dowager
In April 1748, Muhammad Shah died. Her son, Ahmad Shah Bahadur, who was in camp with Safdar Jang near Panipat to return to Delhi and claim the throne. On Safdar Jang's advice, he was enthroned at Panipat and returned to Delhi a few days later. Ahmad Shah Bahadur proved to be an ineffective ruler and was strongly influenced by his mother. A series of defeats and internal struggles led to his downfall. 

She was successively given the titles of "Bai-Ju Sahiba", "Nawab Qudsiya", "Sahiba-uz-Zamani", "Sahibjiu Sahiba", "Hazrat Qibla-i-Alam", and "Mumtaz Mahal". She was known for her generosity. She gave pension to the Begums and the children of the late emperor not only from the government's purse but also from her own funds. She, however, behaved ruthlessly with Badshah Begum and Sahiba Mahal.

Imperial officials used to sit down at her porch daily and she would hold discussions with them from behind a screen or through the medium of eunuchs. All petitions of the realm and closed envelopes were read out to her and she would pass orders on them without consulting anyone. A court historian once lamented, "Oh God! That the affairs of Hindustan should be conducted by a woman as foolish as this!"

She had an affair with the eunuch Javed Khan Nawab Bahadur. He had been an assistant controller of the harem servants and manager of the Begums' estates during the late reign. Javed Khan was assassinated by Safdar Jang on 27 August 1752. She and her son grieved him deeply. It is said that she put on white robes and discarded her jewels and ornaments like a widow. 

The mansab of commanding 50,000 horse was conferred upon her, and her birthday was celebrated with greater pomp than that of the Emperor himself. Her brother, Man Khan, a vagabond haunting the lanes and occasionally following the profession of a male dancer in a supporting role for singing girls, was created a mansabdar of 6,000 with the title of Mutaqad-ud-Daulah Bahadur. At a time when the soldiers were daily mutinying for their long overdue pay and the Court could not raise even two hundred thousand rupees for this purpose, Qudsia Begum spent two crore rupees in celebrating her birthday on 21 January 1754. 

On 26 May 1754, Ahmad Shah was attacked on a journey by a band of Marathas under Malhar Rao Holkar. While running away from Sikandrabad, he took along with him Qudsia Begum, his son Mahmud Shah Bahadur, his favourite wife Inayetpuri Bai, and his half-sister Hazrat Begum leaving all other empresses and princesses at the mercy of the enemies. When Ghazi ud-Din Khan Feroze Jung III reached Delhi on 2 June 1754, the emperor was deposed, arrested and imprisoned with his mother. The two of them were then blinded.

Buildings 
She wielded great influence and commissioned various public and private works. The Golden Mosque near the Red Fort was constructed between 1747 and 1751 for Nawab Bahadur Javid Khan. In 1748, her son commissioned a garden, known as Qudsia Bagh. It consisted of a stone barahdari and a mosque inside it.

References

Sources

External links 

18th-century births
Year of birth unknown
Year of death unknown
Mughal nobility
Women of the Mughal Empire
Mothers of Mughal emperors